Garry MacDonald (born 26 March 1962) is an English former footballer who made nearly 250 appearances in the Football League playing as a forward for Middlesbrough, Carlisle United, Darlington, Stockport County and Hartlepool United.

Life and career
MacDonald was born in 1962 in Middlesbrough. He began his football career with Middlesbrough F.C., and made his first-team debut for them on 8 November 1980, aged 18, in the starting eleven for a 1–0 win away to Brighton & Hove Albion in the First Division. He made 16 appearances over his first two seasons, at the end of which Middlesbrough were relegated to the Second Division. He went on to make 61 appearances before being released in 1984.

He began the 1984–85 season with another Second Division club, Carlisle United, before moving on in October to Darlington of the Fourth Division under the management of Cyril Knowles. He made 33 league appearances as the team gained promotion to the Third Division, and played in all six of their FA Cup ties and scored in the third-round replay as Darlington eliminated his former club Middlesbrough by two goals to one; some 20 years later, that match was voted the best ever played at the Feethams ground. MacDonald top-scored for Darlington in 1985–86 with 16 league goals, but injury deprived him of the chance to partner new signing David Currie the following season, at the end of which they were relegated. In 1987–88, MacDonald played regularly alongside Currie, whose performances earned him a move to a higher level. MacDonald stayed with Darlington for one more season, but left the club when they were relegated out of the Football League into the Conference. He had scored 47 goals from 196 appearances in all competitions.

After a few months with Stockport County during which he made only four first-team appearances, Cyril Knowles signed him for Hartlepool United in December 1989 for a £5,000 fee. MacDonald made 16 appearances that season but scored only once, and after three more matches in the 1990–91 season, he moved into non-league football with South Bank.

Career statistics
Source:

References

1962 births
Living people
Footballers from Middlesbrough
English footballers
Association football forwards
Middlesbrough F.C. players
Carlisle United F.C. players
Darlington F.C. players
Stockport County F.C. players
Hartlepool United F.C. players
South Bank F.C. players
English Football League players
Northern Football League players